Fanga is a commune  and small town in the Cercle of Yélimané in the Kayes Region of western Mali, near the border of Mauritania. In the 2009 census the commune had a population of 7,753.

References

External links
.

Communes of Kayes Region